Eupithecia herefordaria, or Hereford's eupithecia, is a moth in the family Geometridae. It is found in south-eastern Arizona, United States.

The length of the forewings is 9-10.5 mm. The forewings are almost unicolorous gray. Adults are on wing in early spring.

References

Moths described in 1923
herefordaria
Moths of North America